The Anglican Diocese of Western Izon is one of 12 within the Anglican Province of Bendel, itself one of 14 provinces within the Church of Nigeria. The current bishop is Edafe Emamezi.

Notes

Church of Nigeria dioceses
Dioceses of the Province of Bendel